Constantin Brătianu was the name of various members of the Brătianu family
Dincă Brătianu (1768–1844), Vlach boyar
Dinu Brătianu (1866–1950), Romanian politician (last chairman of the old National Liberal party until 1947)
Bebe Brătianu (1887–1955], Romanian politician (last general secretary of the old National Liberal party until 1947)

Brătianu family